One ship and two shore establishments of the Royal Navy have borne the name HMS King Alfred, after Alfred the Great:

Ships
 was a  armoured cruiser launched in 1901 and sold in 1920.

Shore establishments
 was a training establishment at Hove and later at Exbury.
HMS King Alfred II was a branch of the main King Alfred between 1940 and 1944, being renamed HMS King Alfred (M) in 1943.
HMS King Alfred II was the Hove base from January 1946 after the main base had moved to Exbury, until being paid off in June 1946.
 is the Portsmouth division of the Royal Naval Reserve, commissioned in 1994.

Royal Navy ship names